Casner Township is one of sixteen townships in Jefferson County, Illinois, USA.  As of the 2010 census, its population was 1,239 and it contained 510 housing units.

Geography
The township is centered at 38°21'N 89°5'W (38.349,-89.088). It is traversed east–west by Interstate Route 64 and State Route 15.

Cities, towns, villages
 Woodlawn

Unincorporated towns
 Jefferson City at 
 Roaches at 
(This list is based on USGS data and may include former settlements.)

Adjacent townships
 Grand Prairie Township (north)
 Rome Township (northeast)
 Shiloh Township (east)
 McClellan Township (southeast)
 Blissville Township (south)
 DuBois Township, Washington County (southwest)
 Ashley Township, Washington County (west)
 Richview Township, Washington County (west)
 Irvington Township, Washington County (northwest)

Cemeteries
The township contains these three cemeteries: Locust Grove, Mount Catherine and Randolph.

Major highways
  Interstate 64
  Illinois Route 15

Demographics

Political districts
 Illinois' 19th congressional district
 State House District 107
 State Senate District 54

References
 
 United States Census Bureau 2007 TIGER/Line Shapefiles
 United States National Atlas

External links
 City-Data.com
 Illinois State Archives

Townships in Jefferson County, Illinois
Mount Vernon, Illinois micropolitan area
Townships in Illinois